The Nera Gorge-Beușnița National Park (national park category II IUCN) is a protected area situated in Romania, in Caraș-Severin County.

Location 
The Natural Park is located at the south-west limit of the country, in the south of the Anina Mountains (group mountain included in Banat Mountains), in Caraș-Severin County, on the middle course of Nera River and on the upper Beu River.

Description 
Nera Gorge-Beușnița National Park with an area of 36,758 ha was declared natural protected area by the Law Number.5 of March 6, 2000 (published in Romanian Official Paper Number.152 on April 12, 2000)  and represents a mountainous area (mountain peaks, cirques, crevasses, caves, valleys, canyons, waterfalls) what shelters a large variety of flora and fauna; some of the species are endematic or very rarely.

Protected areas included in the park: Nera Gorge-Beușnița, Șușara Gorge, Ducin, Izvorul Bigăr, Izvoarele Nerei, Lisovacea and Valea Ciclovei-Ildia.

Climate 
Climate is a temperate continental, with moderate winters, warm summers, low thermal amplitude, with rich rainfall, with Mediterranean influences.

Hydrology 
The hydrological network includes Nera River and its tributaries: Coșava, Bănia, Beu, Ducin, Miniș, Nergana, Nerganița, Prigor, Rudăria, and Șopotu.

Flora and fauna

Flora 
On the territory of the protected area it has been identified several species of flora with European elements, Central European and Euro-Asian.

Tree and shrub species include: English oak (Quercus robur), Common hornbeam (Carpinus betulus), European beech (Fagus sylvatica), European ash (Fraxinus excelsior), Turkey oak (Quercus cerris), Sessile oak (Quercus petraea), Black alder (Alnus glutinosa), European yew (Taxus baccata), Manna ash (Fraxinus ornus), Turkish hazel (Corylus colurna), European cornel (Cornus mas), Eurasian smoketree (Cotynus coggygria), Ruscus (species of: Ruscus aculeatus or  Ruscus hypogllosum) or Lilac (Syringa vulgaris).

Herbaceous plants include the orchid Himantoglossum caprinum, the fritillary Fritillaria montana, yellow linum (Linum uninerve), Asplenium ceterach (Ceterach officinarum), Cephalaria (Cephalaria laevigata), monkey orchid (Orchis simia), fragrant orchid (Gymnadenia conopsea), corydalis (Corydalis pumila), yellow crocus (Crocus flavus).

Fauna 
Species of mammals: brown bear (Ursus arctos), deer (Cervus elaphus), roe deer (Capreolus capreolus), gray wolf (Canis lupus), wild boar (Sus scrofa),  European otter (Lutra lutra), lynx (Lynx linx), wildcat (Felis silvestris), pine marten (Martes martes), badger (Males males), pygmy shrew (Sorex minutus), Blasius's horseshoe bat (Rhinolophus blasii) or lesser mouse-eared bat (Myotis blythii).

Species of birds: golden eagle (Aquila chrysaetos), lesser spotted eagle (Aquila pomarina), common kingfisher (Alcedo athis), hazel grouse (Bonasa bonasia), hen harrier (Circus cyaneus), Eurasian eagle-owl (Bubo bubo), short-toed snake eagle (Circaetus gallicus), red-breasted flycatcher (Ficedula parva), European honey buzzard (Pernis apivorus), European nightjar (Caprimulgus europaeus), grey-headed woodpecker (Picus canus), Ural owl (Strix uralensis), corn crake (Crex crex), barred warbler (Sylvia nisoria), red-backed shrike (Lanius collurio), ortolan bunting (Emberiza hortulana), European roller (Coracias garrulus), Montagu's harrier (Circus pygargus) or middle spotted woodpecker (Dendrocopos medius).

Species of reptiles, amphibians and frogs: common adder (Vipera berus), green lizard (Lacerta viridis), smooth snake (Coronella austriaca), fire salamander (Salamandra salamandra), alpine newt (Triturus alpestris),  common toad (Bufo bufo) or yellow-bellied toad (Bombina veriegata).

Species of fish: Danube gudgeon (Gobio uranoscopus), Mediterranean barbel (Barbus meridionalis), Sabanejewia aurata, streber (Zingel streber), Balkan loach (Cobitis elongata), Kessler's gudgeon (Gobio kessleri) or Amur bitterling (Rhodeus sericeus amarus).

Access 
 National road DN57B Oraviţa - Sasca Montană - Şopotu Nou - Cărbunari - Bozovici - Anina
 National road DN57B Reşiţa - Caraşova - Anina

See also 
 Protected areas of Romania
 Iron Gates Natural Park 
 Seven Natural Wonders of Romania

Gallery

References

External links 

 infocheilenerei.ro - Cheile Nerei-Beuşniţa National Park

National parks of Romania
Geography of Caraș-Severin County
Protected areas established in 2000
Tourist attractions in Caraș-Severin County
Primeval Beech Forests in Europe